Donald Ralph Wert (born July 29, 1938), nicknamed "Coyote", is an American former professional baseball player. He played as a third baseman in Major League Baseball for the Detroit Tigers from 1963 to 1970 and also briefly played for the Washington Senators in 1971. In 1965, he was named "Tiger of the Year", and in 1968, he was chosen for the American League All Star Team and won a World Series ring.

Early life and education
Born in Strasburg, Pennsylvania, in Lancaster County, Wert attended Franklin & Marshall College in Lancaster, Pennsylvania where he played baseball for the Diplomats. He was signed by the Detroit Tigers as an amateur free agent in 1958 and played several years in the minor leagues. He married Marlena Wert and lived in New Providence, PA. He had 3 kids named Scott, Barb (who married Mr. Glackin), and Kim. The neighbor kids threw rocks at his shed.

Career in Major League Baseball

1963–1967
Wert reached the major leagues in 1963 at the age of 24 and became the Tigers' regular third baseman from 1964–1970. Though never a strong hitter, Wert earned a reputation as one of the best fielding third basemen. In 1965, Wert played all 162 games for the Tigers and led all American League third basemen with a .976 fielding percentage, marking the only year in the 1960s that a third baseman other than Brooks Robinson had led the league in fielding. He also led the team with 159 hits, had a .341 on-base percentage fueled by a career-high 73 walks, and even showed some power with hit 12 home runs. With his performance in 1965, Wert was selected for the first annual "Tiger of the Year" by the Detroit chapter of the Baseball Writers' Association of America, and also finished No. 10 in the American League Most Valuable Player voting. Wert had his best season as a batter in 1966, when he  had a .268 batting average, .342 on-base percentage, 20 doubles, 11 home runs, and 70 runs batted in.

1968–1970
On June 24, 1968, during a game in which Jim Northrup hit two grand slams, Wert was beaned in the 6th inning by Cleveland Indians pitcher Hal Kurtz. The pitch hit Wert in the head, shattering his batting helmet. Wert was carried off on a stretcher, spent two nights in the hospital, missed several games, and was never the same hitter again. He had never hit lower than .257 in five prior seasons, but his batting average dropped to a career-low .200 in 1968, as he managed only 107 hits in 536 at bats.

Despite his low average, Wert was selected to the roster of the 1968 American League All Star Team by American League manager Dick Williams and doubled off Tom Seaver in the eighth inning, but was stranded in a 1-0 loss. He is remembered in Detroit for his 9th inning, game-winning hit on September 17 to clinch the American League pennant. Wert was mobbed by his teammates and fans came pouring onto the field after his pennant-winning single. Tigers broadcaster Ernie Harwell described the scene as follows in his radio broadcast of the game:

Wert also singled in Detroit's final run of the 1968 World Series, driving in Dick Tracewski with two out in the top of the 9th inning in St. Louis, completing the Tigers' comeback to top the defending Series champs, 4-1, winning the series, 4 games to 3.

On July 15, 1969, with President Richard Nixon attending the game in Washington, Wert started a triple play on a ground ball hit by Ed Brinkman. On July 9, 1970, Wert was involved in a bizarre play when Dalton Jones hit a fly ball into the upper deck with the bases loaded. What should have been a grand slam ended up being a three-RBI single, as Jones passed Wert between first and second base. Jones was called out. Jones later blamed Wert, noting that Wert should have been halfway to second base, prepared to advance if it was a home run, and prepared to return to first if it was caught. Instead, Jones recalled that Wert was returning to first to tag up, and Jones passed Wert just 1 or 2 steps past first base.

On October 9, 1970, Wert and Denny McLain were traded to the Washington Senators in an eight-player deal that brought Ed Brinkman, Aurelio Rodríguez, and Joe Coleman to the Tigers. Wert played 20 games for the Senators in 1971. He was batting .050 (2 hits in 40 at bats) when he was released on June 24, 1971.

Assessment
Over nine seasons in the major leagues, Wert played in 1,100 games and had a .242 batting average, 929 hits, 417 runs scored, 389 walks, 366 runs batted in, 129 doubles, and 77 home runs. Wert played 1,043 of his games at third base and collected 914 putouts, 1,987 assists, and 173 double plays.

References

External links

 Don Wert - Baseballbiography.com
 The Second Best Third Baseman, by Ed Rumill, Baseball Digest, June 1968

1938 births
Living people
People from Strasburg, Pennsylvania
Baseball players from Pennsylvania
Major League Baseball third basemen
Detroit Tigers players
Washington Senators (1961–1971) players
American League All-Stars
Valdosta Tigers players
Durham Bulls players
Denver Bears players
Syracuse Chiefs players
Franklin & Marshall Diplomats baseball players